Allan Carriou (born 2 February 1976) is a French ice hockey player. He competed in the men's tournament at the 2002 Winter Olympics.

References

1976 births
Living people
Olympic ice hockey players of France
Ice hockey players at the 2002 Winter Olympics
People from Mont-Saint-Aignan
Sportspeople from Seine-Maritime